Alexander Gray Ryrie  (born 20 August 1971), is a British historian of Protestant Christianity, specializing in the history of England and Scotland in the sixteenth and seventeenth centuries. He was appointed Professor of Divinity at Gresham College in 2018. He was elected a Fellow of the British Academy in 2019.

Biography
Ryrie was born in London, and raised in Washington, DC. After teaching for a year at a school in rural Zimbabwe, Ryrie read history as an undergraduate at Trinity Hall, Cambridge (BA 1993, MA 1997), completed a master's in Reformation studies at the University of St Andrews, and in 2000 took a DPhil in theology at St Cross College, Oxford. His doctoral work, examining how early English evangelical reformers operated within the political atmosphere of Henry VIII's reign, was published as The Gospel and Henry VIII.

Ryrie lives in the Pennines with his wife Victoria (married 1995) and their two children. He has been a reader in the Church of England since 1997, and is licensed to the parish of Shotley St John in the diocese of Newcastle.

Career
From 1999 to 2006, he taught in the Department of Modern History at the University of Birmingham, and is Professor of the History of Christianity at Durham University, where he has worked since 2007. From 2012 to 2015 he was head of the Department of Theology and Religion. He completed a three-year Leverhulme Major Research Fellowship in 2018.

A Fellow of the Ecclesiastical History Society (President, 2019–20), Ryrie is co-editor of The Journal of Ecclesiastical History. In 2018, he was appointed Gresham Professor of Divinity, having been Visiting Professor in the History of Religion at Gresham College from 2015 to 2017.

Works
 The English Reformation: A Very Brief History (2020)
 Unbelievers: An Emotional History of Doubt (2019)
 Protestants: The Faith That Made the Modern World (2017)
 Being Protestant in Reformation Britain (2013)
 The Age of Reformation: The Tudor and Stewart Realms 1485-1603 (2009)
 The Sorcerer's Tale: Faith and Fraud in Tudor England (2008)
 The Origins of the Scottish Reformation (2006)
 The Gospel and Henry VIII: Evangelicals in the Early English Reformation (2003)

References

1971 births
21st-century English historians
Academics of Durham University
Academics of the University of Birmingham
Alumni of St Cross College, Oxford
Alumni of the University of St Andrews
Alumni of Trinity Hall, Cambridge
Anglican lay readers
Anglican scholars
British historians of religion
English Anglicans
Fellows of the British Academy
Living people
Presidents of the Ecclesiastical History Society
Professors of Gresham College
Writers from London